Roadrunner Records is a heavy metal and hard rock label founded in the Netherlands in 1980 by Cees Wessels. Since the 1990s, Roadrunner has been subject to criticism by several of their artists over the label's record contracts, business practices, management and promotion of their artists and releases.

Record contracts 
Roadrunner has been criticised for offering bad record contracts and for not paying its artists.

Many of Roadrunner's former artists have retrospectively criticised their choices to sign with the label. Russ Tippis of the British heavy metal band Satan reflected on their record contract to Roadrunner in 1983: “They sent us a contract through the post, which we took to a lawyer for advice. He was quite unequivocal in his scathing assessment of the terms and said whatever you do, do NOT sign this deal. It was set out for a five album deal but the label would retain the rights to the master recordings in perpetuity, i.e. we would never get them back unless we bought them. Same with the publishing rights too. They proposed a £2000 advance to make the debut LP plus a couple hundred quid for an artist to draw the cover. The proposed royalty cut was 8% of 90% of the base price (not retail). Of course we signed the deal and made the record within budget. Since then, the only royalty payment we’ve received from that album came from Neat after they had re-issued it 15 years ago.” Mike Fleischmann of the hardcore punk band Vision of Disorder also criticised their contract: "We signed away our songs and rights to our merch since they also owned Blue Grape merch company and that was a non negotiable part of the deal. We had zero guidance." Burton C. Bell (formerly of Fear Factory) called Cees Wessels "the dutch devil", and has expressed regret for signing the band's contract.

One of the biggest acts on Roadrunner, Slipknot (who signed a seven-album deal with Roadrunner in 1998), have criticised the label. In a 2014 interview, the band's guitarist Jim Root stated that, despite selling around 20 million albums worldwide, they never received any royalties from the label: "We don't see a penny off of record sales and we never have". During the promotion of their seventh album, The End, So Far (2022), the band alluded to wanting to leave Roadrunner as soon as possible, with Shawn "Clown" Crahan stating in 2021: "we’re getting off our label [after the release of The End, So Far]. And I feel free. It’s got nothing to do with what’s next. It’s just got to do with, 'Get the hell away from me. Similarly, Corey Taylor spoke unfavourably about Slipknot's relationship with Roadrunner in 2022, describing the label as "not even a shadow of what it used to be", as well as criticising the "unceremonious" firings of all of the people the band used to work with in the beginning over the years.

Business practices 
Roadrunner has been subject to criticism over how well it manages their artists and promotes its releases. Mina Caputo of Life of Agony criticised the label's treatment of the aforementioned band during its time on the label, and called the label's management "a fucking soup kitchen" compared to other record labels. Other former acts such as Obituary, Opeth, Chimaira, Vision of Disorder and Sepultura have criticised the label's management or promotion of them and/or their releases.

Amen 

The nu metal/hardcore punk band Amen was critical of Roadrunner and the promotion of the band and their self-titled album in 1999. Six weeks into the album's promotional tour and ten days before the band was scheduled to tour Europe supporting Monster Magnet from November to December 1999, Roadrunner pulled the band's touring support and the band subsequently lost $10,000 of their own finances. The band then forced themselves to write off the album (meaning they were no longer entitled to the album's royalties) in order to leave the label.

Following the UK success of the band's third album, We Have Come For Your Parents, Roadrunner re-released the album with four bonus tracks in January 2001. The reissue was denounced by the band's frontman Casey Chaos, who released a statement, saying: "Don’t buy our record. Just don’t buy the fucking album. What I want to do is just press up 1000 CDs of the B-sides (from ‘Coma America’) and give them away at the shows for free or tell people to go to fucking Napster.” Speaking to Kerrang!, Casey also accused Roadrunner of attempting to "cash in on all the hard work that Virgin [(the band's record label at the time)] have put into Amen." Roadrunner Records has disputed this claim: “At the time, [Roadrunner] in America wanted Amen to work on their second album rather than go out on tour. The band said it was not what they wanted and it was mutually agreed that they should leave the label.” Mark Williams, Roadrunner's UK manager at the time, said that due to Roadrunner's financial investment in the band, it was "only right that [they] should be allowed to reap some benefits" from Amen's success.

In a separate interview to BraveWords, Casey also said that other acts on Roadrunner were "very envious" that Amen was able to leave the label: "You would figure with an independent you can get more freedom, but that's not the case. Robb Flynn from Machine Head was almost crying when he heard that we were able to leave Roadrunner."

Glassjaw 

The post-hardcore band Glassjaw and its members Daryl Palumbo and Justin Beck have widely and continually criticised Roadrunner for their handling of the band and their 2000 debut album, Everything You Ever Wanted to Know About Silence. Following their departure from the label in December 2001 after a protracted legal dispute between the label and Ross Robinson (whose I AM Recordings imprint the band was signed to), Palumbo has said: "Roadrunner is a joke. Roadrunner’s not even a real label. It has the power to be one of the superpowers in the heavy music industry. While labels like Victory Records, which is such a small hardcore label, is totally surpassing Roadrunner... It's like the scourge of the music industry." Beck has said: "Seriously, don't ever support anything from Roadrunner – they suck!" Palumbo has said that Roadrunner didn't put the band on enough tours: "We never toured half as much as we wanted to, I just wish we got to tour more in support of [Everything You Ever Wanted to Know About Silence]". He also said, "They are a miserable fuckin' corporation that does not bend for their bands, does not give their bands anything and they're just terrible businessmen....They had 2 cash cows, Slipknot and Nickelback, and every other project they had rode backseat to those bands, and then the second that the new Slipknot record came out and didn't go quadruple Platinum in the first few hours it was released they fuckin' turned their backs on Slipknot. That label just wants instant gratification where it sells its units and that's a joke. You can't run a major corporation with that as your business strategy". In addition, Roadrunner blocked their song "Convectuoso" from appearing on their second album, Worship and Tribute (2002), as the band had released a demo of the song on the Roadrunner single "Ry Ry's Song" in 2001; thus, Roadrunner claimed another label releasing a rerecording was a breach of contract. Beck has advised their fans not to buy Everything You Ever Wanted to Know About Silence and its 2009 reissue (which ironically contains "Convectuoso"), so as not to give Roadrunner money, and have repeatedly told fans at shows to illegally download the record.

Megadeth 
Dave Mustaine of the thrash metal band Megadeth slammed Roadrunner Records in late 2009 over the promotion of the band's twelfth studio album, Endgame. Mustaine was annoyed at Roadrunner as, despite the album's widespread acclaim, Endgame performed poorly commercially due to their poor promotion of the album. "Kudos Roadrunner, the is the first worldwide critically acclaimed record by the press, and the fans, and you just can't seem to get this right. This is the first time that everyone likes a record of mine, and you can't get us on the radio or into the stores." Mustaine also criticised Roadrunner for forcing him to change the title of his re-recording of "A Tout Le Monde" on United Abominations to "Set Me Free (A Tout Le Monde)", and said in an interview to Blabbermouth he would "rather retire" than extend his deal with the label. In response, Roadrunner threatened to pull their support for the album and drop Megadeth. Ultimately, Megadeth remained on the label and left Roadrunner following the release of Th1rt3en in 2012.

Treatment of older acts 
Roadrunner has received criticism for focusing on newer and trendier artists, rather than the band's older acts, which were typically rooted in death metal.

The death metal band Deicide was subject to notably poor treatment by Roadrunner, who did not allow the band to record music videos and poorly promoted the band throughout their time on the label. Brian Hoffman described the band's 2001 album In Torment In Hell as rushed because "we just wanted to get off the label", adding, "They didn't care about Deicide anymore. They were more interested in bands like Slipknot". Glen Benton has said similar sentiments about Roadrunner: "They were shelving all the records. What’s the point of fuckin putting all this effort and all this hard work into something that’s gonna get thrown in the fuckin garbage can? We had reached our point with Roadrunner where we just stopped cooperating. Our last two records with them were just obligations, just throw ‘em the fuck out. And to me, those records are repetitious and redundant and I just, you know – to me, it was either that or give them a country record or a fuckin gospel album."

During the late 1990s and early 2000s, Roadrunner began signing more commercial acts such as Coal Chamber, Slipknot and Nickelback. The subsequent push by the label for more commercial music has been met with criticism from some of the band's former acts, such as Dry Kill Logic, who despite having strong sales with little promotion left Roadrunner after refusing to act in a more commercial direction, and Glassjaw's Daryl Palumbo, who described most of the label's acts and releases at the time as "clown ass shit". Nickelback have received some criticism by the public and music critics and have been named by some publications as "the band that destroyed Roadrunner".

Amanda Palmer controversy 

In March 2009, Amanda Palmer performed a live ballad called "Please Drop Me", pleading for Roadrunner to drop Palmer from her record contract. Palmer, who had signed to Roadrunner in 2003 whilst in The Dresden Dolls, wanted to leave over the poor promotion of her 2008 solo album, Who Killed Amanda Palmer, and the label's attempt to remove shots of Palmer's belly from the music video of "Leeds United", as "they thought [she] looked fat". Whilst her relationship with Roadrunner was favourable when the band first signed to the label, she stated in an open letter that her relationship with Roadrunner soured after the label stopped promoting The Dresden Dolls' second album, Yes, Virginia..., shortly after its release in 2006, as well as withdrawing promised funding for the band members' side projects. "When I confronted them with the unfairness, one the brass there literally replied, over the phone 'Well, Amanda, we're a big bad record label. That's how things go.' That enraged me." The controversy over the attempted belly censorship led to lots of backlash and protest, accusations of sexism against the label, and the creation of the "Rebellyon" movement by her fanbase against Roadrunner Records and fat-shaming. Palmer was eventually released from her contract in April 2010, and released a single, "The Truth...", for free to commemorate being dropped from the label.

References 

Criticism
Roadrunner Records artists
Record labels
Music criticism